Joshua David Falkingham (born 25 August 1990) is an English professional footballer who plays as a midfielder for  club Harrogate Town.

Falkingham started his career as a youth player with Leeds United, before having spells with St Johnstone and Arbroath. He spent four years with Dunfermline Athletic, where he won promotion to the Scottish Championship, as well as being club captain over two spells.

Club career
Falkingham grew up in Rothwell just outside Leeds and played at youth level for Leeds United from the age of eight. He featured in their various youth teams for eleven years, however was unable to break through to the first team and was released from the club in 2010.

On 19 March 2010, Falkingham signed for Scottish Premier League side St Johnstone, on a short-term deal. On 5 May 2010, he made his debut for the club, coming on as a 28th-minute substitute replacing Murray Davidson in a 0–0 draw with Falkirk. After only one appearance, Falkingham was released by the club at the end of the season.

In June 2010, he signed for Scottish Third Division side Arbroath on a one-year deal. He made his debut on 24 July 2010, in a 1–0 defeat to Dunfermline Athletic in the Challenge Cup. On 7 August 2010, the opening day of the league season, he scored twice in a 5–3 win over Elgin City. He was a regular starter in his first season, scoring 9 goals and helping the team win the title and promotion to the Scottish Second Division.

Falkingham signed a contract extension to extend his stay at the club for another season. He held his place in the team and scored a further eight goals, with the team finishing second in the league, losing out on promotion in the play-offs. He was subsequently named in the PFA Scotland's Division Two Team of the Year. In all Falkingham made 70 league appearances, scoring 17 times for Arbroath.

On 8 June 2012, Falkingham signed for Scottish First Division side Dunfermline Athletic on a three-year deal. An undisclosed development fee was paid to Arbroath as compensation due to his age. He made his debut on 28 July 2012, in a 3–2 defeat to Forfar Athletic in the Challenge Cup. On 11 August 2012, he made his league debut in a 4–0 win over Cowdenbeath, scoring the last goal. In September 2013 he scored a stunning goal against Ayr United in which the game ended 5–1.

On 20 February 2014, Falkingham signed a contract extension until 31 May 2016. After achieving promotion to the second tier of Scottish football, Falkingham was released by Dunfermline at the end of the 2015–16 season.

After four months without a club, Falkingham signed for National League North side Darlington 1883 in September 2016, making his debut in a 0–1 defeat against Lancaster City in the Second Qualifying Round of the FA Cup.

In May 2017 Falkingham signed for Harrogate Town, winning the National League playoffs in 2019/20 and FA Trophy 2019/20, with Falkingham scoring the winning goal for the club first ever FA Trophy title. (the game was played in 3 May 2021 though due to covid-19 pandemic)

Career statistics

Honours
Dunfermline Athletic
Scottish League One: 2015–16

Harrogate Town
National League play-offs: 2020
FA Trophy: 2019–20

References

External links

1990 births
Living people
Footballers from Leeds
English footballers
Association football midfielders
Leeds United F.C. players
St Johnstone F.C. players
Arbroath F.C. players
Dunfermline Athletic F.C. players
Darlington F.C. players
Harrogate Town A.F.C. players
Scottish Premier League players
Scottish Football League players
Scottish Professional Football League players
National League (English football) players
English Football League players
People from Rothwell, West Yorkshire